James Donald Ollom (born July 8, 1945) is a former Major League Baseball player from Snohomish, Washington who pitched for the Minnesota Twins in 1966-1967.

Ollom was originally signed by the New York Yankees as an amateur free agent prior to the 1963 season. In 1966 he won 20 games for the Denver Bears of the Pacific Coast League, and earned a late season stint with the Twins. In 1967 he pitched in 21 games for Minnesota (19 games as a reliever and 2 games as a starter). In 35 innings pitched, he had a 5.40 ERA and his only decision was a loss.

External links 

Major League Baseball pitchers
Minnesota Twins players
Baseball players from Washington (state)
1945 births
Living people
People from Snohomish, Washington
Charlotte Hornets (baseball) players
Denver Bears players
Wilson Tobs players
Harlan Yankees players
Florida Instructional League Twins players
Bismarck-Mandan Pards players